Limonoids are phytochemicals of the triterpenoid class which are abundant in sweet or sour-scented citrus fruit and other plants of the families Cucurbitaceae, Rutaceae, and Meliaceae. Certain limonoids are antifeedants such as azadirachtin from the neem tree.

Chemically, the limonoids consist of variations of the furanolactone core structure.  The prototypical structure consists of four six-membered rings and a furan ring.  Limonoids are classed as tetranortriterpenes.

Citrus fruits contain the limonoids limonin, nomilin and nomilinic acid, while both neem seeds and leaves contain the limonoid azadirachtin, although higher concentrations are present in the former.

See also 
 Tetranortriterpenoid

References 

Terpenes and terpenoids
3-Furyl compounds
Lactones